Anguina amsinckiae (Fiddleneck flower gall nematode) is a plant pathogenic nematode, which attacks the weed called fiddleneck.

References 

Agricultural pest nematodes
Tylenchida